Agrabad Mohila College is a private women's degree college in Chittagong, Bangladesh. It has Higher Secondary School Certificate (HSC) program under Board of Intermediate and Secondary Education, and offers bachelor's degrees under the academic affiliation with National University, along with bearing EIIN number 104303.

History
In 1986, to facilitate a women's college in the Double Mooring area projecting it as the pit of higher education in the southern part of the city was planned by Abu Naser, the then member of (Agrabad Residential Area Socio-Cultural Association) (ARASCA). M.A. Mannan, present Minister of Planning of Bangladesh, was the chief guest of the master ceremony. It was established at road no #17, Chittagong Development Authority (CDA) residential area, Agrabad, Chittagong.

Jarina Hossain, founder principal and later on chief of the project architect, made the architectural design of the college free of cost.

Campus

See also 
 List of colleges in Chittagong

References

External links 

 

Colleges in Chittagong
Buildings and structures in Agrabad
Educational institutions established in 1988
1988 establishments in Bangladesh